Jules Béland (born 31 March 1948) is a Canadian former cyclist. He competed in the individual road race and the team time trial events at the 1968 Summer Olympics.

References

External links
 

1948 births
Living people
Canadian male cyclists
Olympic cyclists of Canada
Cyclists at the 1968 Summer Olympics
Cyclists from Quebec City